The Legion of Super-Heroes is a superhero team in comic book series published by DC Comics. The team has gone through various iterations. Starting with the founding trio of Cosmic Boy, Lightning Lad, and Saturn Girl, all versions of the team include teenage superheroes from several planets and alien races. In some versions, the team swells to two dozen or more members, with different sub-groupings, such as the Legion of Substitute Heroes.

Original team (1958–1994)

Introduced in Adventure Comics #247 (April 1958), the original version of the team appeared in various titles for 36 years until Legion of Super-Heroes (vol. 4) #61 (September 1994).

Founding members

Silver Age members

"Bronze Age" members

Post-Crisis on Infinite Earths members

Joined during the "Five Year Gap"
Many of these individuals were only depicted in flashbacks, and information regarding their tenure is often extremely limited.

Joined after the "Five Year Gap"

Reserve and honorary members

Expelled members

Batch SW6/New Earth team
Introduced in Legion of Super-Heroes vol. 4, #24 (December 1991), "Batch SW6" included teenage versions of the original Legion (whose members had all reached adulthood), which appeared in the original continuity until Legion of Super-Heroes vol. 4, #61 (September 1994). Batch SW6's roster was equivalent to the original Legion's membership immediately following the team's first encounter with Universo, with Valor and Laurel Gand replacing Superboy, Mon-El and Supergirl (with all three of Triplicate Girl's bodies intact). The members of this team were shown to be temporal duplicates of the original Legionnaires created by the Time Trapper. Additionally, five non-SW6 members joined: Computo (Danielle Foccart), Dragonmage, Catspaw, Kid Quantum, and the adult Reep Daggle (Chameleon).

Reboot members (1994–2004)

This version of the Legion emerged in the aftermath of Zero Hour, and first appeared in Legion of Super-Heroes vol. 4, #0 (October 1994). It was revealed in Infinite Crisis #6 (May 2006) that this version of the team inhabits Earth-247.

Founding members

Pre-draft

Draftees

Post-draft

Post-Blight

"Threeboot" Legion (2004–2009)

This version of the Legion first appeared in the Teen Titans/Legion Special (November 2004). It was revealed in Final Crisis: Legion of 3 Worlds #5 (September 2009) that this version of the team inhabits Earth-Prime, the home of supervillain Superboy-Prime.

Founding members

Recruits

Reserve members

Post-Infinite Crisis Legion (1958–1989, 2007–2015)
This version of the Legion was first introduced in Adventure Comics #247 (April 1958) as the original version of the team, which appeared under various titles for 31 years until Legion of Super-Heroes vol. 3, #63 (August 1989). The "Five Years Later" Legion (1989–1994, vol. 4) picks up the original Legion's story line with "The Lightning Saga" story arc in Justice League of America and Justice Society of America (June–August 2007). Its membership reflects the original, pre-Crisis on Infinite Earths Legion up to the events of Legion of Super-Heroes vol. 3, #63, and includes changes in Legion membership made in the Superman and the Legion of Super-Heroes story arc, the Final Crisis: Legion of Three Worlds mini-series, and subsequent volumes of Legion of Super-Heroes.

Founding members

Silver Age members

"Bronze Age" members

Post-Infinite Crisis members

Arrowverse
This version of the team appears in the TV series Supergirl, referred to as "the Legion".

Notes

References

Lists of DC characters by organization
Members